Ahmed al-Tilemsi was a Malian terrorist, a commander in the Insurgency in the Maghreb and the co-founder of the extremist Islamist organization known as MOJWA. He was one of the perpetrators of the In Amenas hostage crisis which killed 67 people and gained Tilemsi a $5 million bounty set by the U.S. He was killed in a skirmish with French forces in Mali on December 11, 2014.

References 

1977 births
2014 deaths
Leaders of al-Qaeda in the Islamic Maghreb
Malian Islamists
People from Gao Region
Terrorism in Africa
21st-century Malian people